John Bartholomew (20 January 1888 – 14 July 1965) was an English professional rugby league footballer who played in the 1900s, 1910s and 1920s. Jack Bartholomew was the uncle of the comedian Eric Morecambe (real name John Eric Bartholomew).

Background
Jack Bartholomew was born in Morecambe, Lancashire, and his death aged 77 was registered in Bradford district, West Riding of Yorkshire, England.

Playing career

International honours
Jack Bartholomew was selected for Great Britain while at Huddersfield for the 1910 Great Britain Lions tour of Australia and New Zealand.

County Cup Final appearances
Jack Bartholomew played in Huddersfield's 21–0 victory over Batley in the 1909 Yorkshire County Cup Final during the 1909–10 season at Headingley Rugby Stadium, Leeds on Saturday 27 November 1909, the 8–2 defeat by Wakefield Trinity in the 1910 Yorkshire County Cup Final during the 1910–11 season at Headingley Rugby Stadium, Leeds on Saturday 3 December 1910, and the 22–10 victory over Hull Kingston Rovers in the 1911 Yorkshire County Cup Final during the 1911–12 season at Belle Vue, Wakefield on Saturday 25 November 1911.

References

External links
Great Britain Statistics at englandrl.co.uk

Search for "Bartholomew" at rugbyleagueproject.org
Photograph 'Jack Bartholomew - Jack Bartholomew came to Birch Lane in 1914 and stayed until 1922, playing mostly at stand off. He had bee one of Huddersfield's 'Team of all talents' and had toured with the Lions in 1910. - Date: 01/01/1914' at rlhp.co.uk
Papers Past — Evening Post — 14 May 1910 – Football
Jack Bartholomew at huddersfieldrlheritage.co.uk
The 'Team Of All Talents' A Claret And Gold Phenomenon
Remembering Fartown legend Harold Wagstaff

1888 births
1965 deaths
Bradford Bulls players
English rugby league players
Huddersfield Giants players
Rugby league fullbacks
Rugby league centres
Rugby league players from Morecambe
Rugby league wingers
Rugby league five-eighths